Ringer(s) may refer to:

Sports and games
 Ringer, in sports idiom, an impostor, especially one whose pretense is intended to gain an advantage in a competition
 Road course ringer, a non-NASCAR driver hired to race at a road course
 A game piece used for scoring in the 2007 FIRST Robotics Competition game Rack 'n Roll
 In horseshoes, a shoe that encircles the stake
 Ringer or ring taw, a marbles game played in British and World Marbles Championship

Fiction
 Ringer (comics), a Marvel Comics villain
 A member of Tolkien fandom
 Ringers: Lord of the Fans, a documentary on the subject

Film and television
 , a 1996 film starring Timothy Bottoms
 Ringer (TV series), starring Sarah Michelle Gellar

Music
 Ringer (EP), an EP by Four Tet
 "Ringer" (song), a song by Godflesh

Other
 Ringer (surname)
 Ringer Edwards (1913–2000), Australian soldier
 Bell-ringer, one who plays bells, especially church bells
 Lactated Ringer's solution, also known as Ringer's, a fluid used in medical treatment
 Intravenous sugar solution, usually glucose
 A term for an Australian stockman, in the Top End of the Northern Territory
 An ornithologist trained in bird ringing
 Ringing (telephony) or telephone ringer, an electrical device to alert a telephone subscriber to an incoming call
 A style of T-shirt

See also 
 The Ringer (disambiguation)
 Dead Ringer (disambiguation)
 Wringer (disambiguation)